USS LST-177 was a  in the United States Navy during World War II. She was later sold to France as Laita (K05).

Construction and career 
LST-177 was laid down on 5 February 1943 at Missouri Valley Bridge & Iron Co., Evansville, Indiana. Launched on 16 May 1943 and commissioned on 22 June 1943.

Service in the United States 
During World War II, LST-177 was assigned to the Europe-Africa-Middle East theater. She took part in the Convoy UGS-36 on 1 April 1944 and Operation Dragoon from 15 August to 25 September 1944.

LST-277 was decommissioned on 17 February 1946.

She was struck from the Navy Register on 12 April 1946.

Service in France 
She was transferred to the French Navy and commissioned on 13 March 1947 with the name Laita (K05). The ship was reclassified L9001 later in her career.

Laita took part in the Algerian War between 1 November 1954 to 19 March 1962 and the First Indochina War between 19 December 1946 to 1 August 1954.

During the 10th Anniversary of the Landing in Provence, Southern France, she was present in the event.

The ship took part in the Marseille-Bizerte crossing from 7 January to 9 January 1958 but was caught in a storm which forced the captain to take shelter between Corsica and Sardinia. Sick people were present in the ship's holding compartment and was packed with people. In sight of Bizerte, the ship disembarked at night.

The ship was out of service in January 1962 and sold for scrap later in December 1977.

Awards 
LST-177 have earned the following awards:

American Campaign Medal
Europe-Africa-Middle East Campaign Medal (52 battle stars)
World War II Victory Medal

Citations

Sources 
 
 
 
 

World War II amphibious warfare vessels of the United States
Ships built in Evansville, Indiana
1943 ships
LST-1-class tank landing ships of the United States Navy
Ships transferred from the United States Navy to the French Navy